6th Vitranc Cup was an alpine skiing competition, held between 11 and 12 March 1967 in Kranjska Gora, SR Slovenia, Yugoslavia. They were hosting two FIS 1A international events.

Official results

Giant slalom 
On 11 March, giant slalom at vertical drop at 435 metres was held.

Slalom 
On 12 March, slalom was held.

References

External links
 

International sports competitions hosted by Yugoslavia
1967 in Yugoslav sport
International sports competitions hosted by Slovenia
Alpine skiing competitions
Alpine skiing in Slovenia
1967 in Slovenia